Armitstead is a surname. Notable people with the surname include:

 Claire Armitstead, British journalist and author
 George Armitstead (1847) (1847–1912), Latvian mayor
 George Armitstead, 1st Baron Armitstead (1824–1915), British businessman, philanthropist and politician
 John Armitstead (1868–1941), English clergyman
 Lizzie Armitstead (born 1988), English cyclist
 William Armitstead (1833–1907), English cricketer

See also 
 Armistead
 Armstead

References 

English-language surnames